Garcinia imberti is a species of flowering plant in the family Clusiaceae. It is found only in India.

References

Endemic flora of India (region)
imberti
Taxonomy articles created by Polbot

Critically endangered flora of Asia
Taxobox binomials not recognized by IUCN